The Discovery is a 2017 British-American romantic science fiction film, directed by Charlie McDowell from a screenplay by himself and Justin Lader. It stars Rooney Mara, Jason Segel, Robert Redford, Jesse Plemons, Riley Keough, and Ron Canada.

The film had its world premiere at the Sundance Film Festival on January 20, 2017. It was released on March 31, 2017, by Netflix.

Plot
An interviewer questions Thomas Harbor, the man who scientifically proved the existence of an afterlife, a discovery that led to an extremely high suicide rate. The interviewer asks Harbor if he feels responsible, and he says no. Directly after, a film crew member kills himself on air.

On the second anniversary of the discovery, Harbor's son Will travels on a ferry where he meets Isla. They have a conversation and Will notes Isla looks very familiar. He says he is upset people keep killing themselves, while Isla thinks it's an easy way out. Will shares a memory he had while being dead for a minute, where he saw a young boy at a beach.

Will's brother Toby picks him up and drives him to an isolated mansion where their father is continuing his research. Will notes the large number of helpers, who Toby says used to be suicidal and now have a new purpose. Will meets Lacey and Cooper, his father's aides. Thomas is periodically "put under" and revived while hooked to various machines. When they speak, Will blames Thomas for starting a cult and for the high suicide rate. Will announces his intention to get Thomas to recant his statement about the afterlife and stop the suicides.

Later, Will sees Isla on the beach preparing to commit suicide. He barely saves her and brings her to the mansion, where she is taken in. At a later meeting with the occupants, Thomas reveals his new work - a machine that can record what people see in the afterlife.

To test the machine, Toby, Will and Isla steal the corpse of Pat Phillips from the morgue. Will reveals to Isla the reason for his resentment towards Thomas: his mother killed herself when Thomas was too obsessed with his work to care about her.

Phillips' corpse is hooked to the machine, but nothing happens. After everyone leaves, Will undoes his earlier sabotage on the machine. Immediately the screen shows a video sequence of Pat Phillips driving to a hospital, visiting someone and fighting with a woman there. Will visits the hospital, but finds the hallway from the video gone.

During a meeting, Thomas confronts Lacey about revealing to others about the failed test and expels her from the mansion. Will shows Isla the recording, theorizing that the machine records memory rather than the afterlife. They find a record of Pat Phillips' father, who died in the hospital. Further investigations reveals the events in the recording don't match what actually happened. Pat never visited his dying father in the hospital.

Isla confides in Will that she had a son, who died while she was asleep. Isla and Will grow closer together and share a kiss, which is interrupted by Toby.

Together they rush to Thomas, who is hooked to the machine. They observe he is seeing the night their mother killed herself, except that Thomas stops her. They are able to revive Thomas, who concludes the afterlife is an alternate version of their existing life, only with different choices made. They agree to destroy the machine, as this revelation would provoke millions of suicides by people wanting to improve the lives they have. Thomas prepares to hold a speech, which is interrupted by Lacey shooting Isla, claiming she has just "relocated" her. Isla dies in Will's arms.

Later, a devastated Will hooks himself up with the machine. He arrives back on the ferry, where he meets Isla again, who states this is a memory. It is revealed Will is living in a memory loop trying to prevent Isla's death and he restarts on the ferry every time. Isla says he saved her and they both will move on now. Although Toby and Thomas try to revive Will, he dies, promising Isla to remember her.

Will stands on the beach, where he sees a little boy and gets him out of the water. The little boy's mother, Isla, arrives and thanks Will. They don't recognize each other. After she leaves, he walks away, but as he starts to recall who Isla is, he stops and slowly looks back.

Cast
 Rooney Mara as Isla
 Jason Segel as Will Harbor
 Jesse Plemons as Toby Harbor
 Riley Keough as Lacey
 Robert Redford as Thomas Harbor
 Ron Canada as Cooper
 Mary Steenburgen as Interviewer

Production
In October 2015, it was revealed that Rooney Mara and Nicholas Hoult had been cast in the film, with Charlie McDowell directing from the script, co-written with Justin Lader, and Alex Orlovsky and James D. Stern producing under their Verisimilitude and Endgame Entertainment banners, respectively. In March 2016, it was revealed that Robert Redford and Jason Segel had joined the cast of the film, with Segel replacing Hoult who had to drop out due to scheduling conflicts. That same month, Riley Keough and Jesse Plemons joined the cast. Danny Bensi and Saunder Jurriaans composed the film's score.

Principal photography began on March 28, 2016, in Newport, Rhode Island. Production concluded on May 1, 2016.

Release
In June 2016, Netflix acquired global distribution rights to the film, with a planned 2017 release. The film had its world premiere at the Sundance Film Festival on January 20, 2017. The film was released on March 31, 2017.

Reception
The Discovery received mixed reviews from film critics. It holds a 46% approval rating on review aggregator website Rotten Tomatoes, based on 63 reviews, with a weighted average of 5.60/10. The website's critics consensus reads: "The Discovery looks fascinating on paper, but in spite of its thought-provoking premise and starry ensemble, it's a disappointing case of untapped potential." On Metacritic, the film holds a rating of 54 out of 100, based on 19 critics, indicating "mixed or average reviews".

Dennis Harvey of Variety gave the film a generally negative review, saying "Though The Discovery starts out with a great premise, its mystery dissipates over a somewhat tepid course as the concept ultimately heads in a direction we've seen many times before" and criticized the chemistry between Segel and Mara.

References

External links
 
 
 

2017 films
2017 independent films
2017 romance films
2017 science fiction films
2010s English-language films
American independent films
American science fiction romance films
British independent films
British science fiction romance films
Endgame Entertainment films
English-language Netflix original films
Films about the afterlife
Films about suicide
Films set in country houses
Films shot in Rhode Island
2010s American films
2010s British films